Muhammad Sherin(Pashto:محمد شیرین) ;known as Marghuzar Babajee, is a Muslim Sufi(pir), saint and Islamic scholar of Qadiriyya Chishti Silsila (order).

He was born in 1933 in Talash, Dir state  to Ghulam Muhammad. His grandfather; Hasan Khan was the disciple of Akhund of Swat. He is father of two daughters. He remained the disciple of Abdul Hadi (Shah Mansur), Maulana Khan Bahadar (Martung babajee), Maulana Sirajul Yum (Gharai Babajee), Maulana Zardad babajee (Mingora) and Maulana Rahimullah (Mingora).

Muhanmmad Sherin used to stay in a cave near the town Marghuzar known as the cave of Akhund of Swat (A cave where Saidu Baba used to stay and pray), for nearly 17 years. He is now settled in a mosque near Marghuzar where a large numbers of his disciples visit him and receive spiritual education.

Muhammad Sherin performed Hajj (Pilgrimage) four times and few Umrahs. Before sitting in a Chillah he used to work as labour in the construction roads in Swat. He visited India with his brothers to earn their livelihood. He also visited Afghanistan in 1997 where he called on religious scholars. He also visited the tomb of Tamim Ansari and Jubair.

See also 

Akhund of Swat

References 

Pashtun people
Living people
1933 births
People from Swat District
Sufism
Scholars of Sufism